Heart of Arizona is a 1938 American Western film directed by Lesley Selander and written by Norman Houston. The film stars William Boyd, George "Gabby" Hayes, Russell Hayden, John Elliott, Billy King, Natalie Moorhead and Dorothy Short. The film was released on April 22, 1938, by Paramount Pictures.

Plot

Belle (Natalie Moorhead) is being released after serving a five-year prison sentence for standing by her outlaw husband, Sam. The sheriff (John Beach) wants to drop her off in a Nogales dancehall, but Hoppy (William Boyd) forces him to let her go back to her ranch.

Cast
 William Boyd as Hopalong Cassidy
 George "Gabby" Hayes as Windy Halliday 
 Russell Hayden as Lucky Jenkins
 John Elliott as Buck Peters
 Billy King as Artie
 Natalie Moorhead as Belle Starr
 Dorothy Short as Jackie Starr
 Stephen Chase as Dan Ringo
 John Beach as Sheriff Hawley
 Lane Chandler as Trimmer Winkler
 Leo J. McMahon as Twister

References

External links 
 
 
 
 

1938 films
1930s English-language films
American Western (genre) films
1938 Western (genre) films
Paramount Pictures films
Films directed by Lesley Selander
Hopalong Cassidy films
American black-and-white films
1930s American films